Walter Ernest Alexander (March 5, 1891 – December 29, 1978) was a former Major League Baseball player. He batted and threw right-handed, and weight 165 pounds. He was a catcher for the St. Louis Browns and the New York Yankees. In 162 career games with the Browns and Yankees, Alexander had 76 hits in 405 at bats (.188 average). He had 1 home run and 24 RBIs. He started managing teams in 1923, he took time off from managing in 1926 and 1927, he resumed managing in 1928.

External links

Baseball-Reference.com

1891 births
1978 deaths
Major League Baseball catchers
New York Yankees players
St. Louis Browns players
Baseball players from Atlanta
Minor league baseball managers
Ellsworth Blues players
Manhattan Maroons players
Ogden Canners players
Oakland Oaks (baseball) players
Toledo Iron Men players
Beaumont Oilers players
Beaumont Exporters players
Marlin Bathers players
Greenville Hunters players
Austin Senators players
San Angelo Sheep Herders players